Hugo Vivian Hope Throssell, VC (26 October 1884 – 19 November 1933) was an Australian soldier in the First World War who was the first Western Australian and only Australian light horseman to receive the Victoria Cross (VC), the highest award for valour in battle that could be awarded to a member of the Australian armed forces at the time.

Early life
Hugo Vivian Hope Throssell was born in Northam, Western Australia on 26 October 1884, the son of George Throssell, who was later briefly Premier of Western Australia, and his wife Anne,  Morrell. Hugo was one of fourteen children born to the couple. He was educated at Prince Alfred College in Adelaide from January 1896 to December 1902, where, nicknamed "Jimmy", he was a noted athlete, and captain of three intercollegiate sports teams. 

On the outbreak of the First World War in 1914, he joined the Australian Imperial Force and was allotted to the 10th Light Horse Regiment. His brother, Frank Erick Cottrell Throssell, known as "Ric", also served in the war and died near Gaza. Hugo Throssell's son, Richard Prichard "Ric" Throssell, shared the same family nickname as his uncle.

First World War
As a second lieutenant Hugo Throssell fought at Gallipoli, where he had landed on 4 August. He saw action in the desperate Battle of the Nek. According to the Australian Dictionary of Biography:

A few weeks later, he fought at Hill 60:

Whilst recuperating from his wounds in London he was introduced to Katharine Susannah Prichard, an Australian journalist who had recently won a significant novel competition and would go on to be a famous author and socialist. He eventually returned to active service, rejoining the 10th Light Horse in the Middle East where he fought in a number of engagements, and achieved the rank of captain. He returned home in 1918, and in 1919 married Prichard after the war ended.

Post-war, socialism and death

In the following years Throssell was an outspoken opponent of war, and claimed that the suffering he had seen had made him a socialist. His stance on the futility of war outraged many people, especially as it was being expressed by a national war hero and the son of a respected and conservative former premier. His very public political opinions badly damaged his employment prospects, and he fell deeply into financial debt. On 19 November 1933, he killed himself, while his wife was on a tour of the Soviet Union.

Memorials

Hugo Vivian Hope Throssell was buried with full military honours in the Anglican section of Karrakatta cemetery, Perth. In 2014 the grave was refurbished and a new grave stone placed.

In 1954 an octagonal stone gazebo was dedicated to Throssell in Greenmount at the intersection of Great Eastern Highway and Old York Road. It stands opposite the Katharine Susannah Prichard Writers' Centre.

A ward at the former Repatriation General Hospital, Hollywood was temporarily named in his honour.

Throssell's Victoria Cross is displayed in the Hall of Valour at the Australian War Memorial in Canberra. In 1983 his son Ric Throssell presented it to People for Nuclear Disarmament. The Returned Services League of Australia bought the medal and presented it to the Australian War Memorial.

A statue of Throssell was unveiled in the Avon Mall in Northam on Anzac Day 2015.

References

Further reading

External links

Suzanne Welborn, 'Throssell, Hugo Vivian Hope (1884–1933)', Australian Dictionary of Biography, Volume 12, Melbourne University Press, 1990, pp 223–224.
Second Lieutenant Hugo Throssell VC, People profiles, Australian War Memorial

1884 births
1933 deaths
Australian Army officers
Australian Gallipoli campaign recipients of the Victoria Cross
Australian World War I recipients of the Victoria Cross
People educated at Prince Alfred College
Australian military personnel who committed suicide
People from Northam, Western Australia
Suicides in Western Australia
Katharine Susannah Prichard
Military personnel from Western Australia
Burials at Karrakatta Cemetery